Lippert is a German surname. Notable people with the surname include:

 Bernhard Lippert (born 1962), German football manager
 Bill Lippert (born 1950), American politician and gay rights activist
 Donald Francis Lippert, American Roman Catholic bishop
 George Lippert (1844–1906), German-American sideshow performer born with three legs and two hearts
 Howard Vernon, born Mario Lippert (1914–1996), Swiss actor
 James G. Lippert (1917–2010), American politician
 Julius Lippert (1895–1956), German Nazi politician, mayor of Berlin 1937–1940
 Julius Lippert (historian) (1839–1909), Czech historian
 Liane Lippert (born 1999), German cyclist
 Lothar Lippert (born 1939), German field hockey player
 Margaret H. Lippert (born 1942), American author
 MaryAnn Lippert (born 1953), American health educator, health administrator and politician
 Mark Lippert (born 1973), American politician
 Michael Lippert (1897–1969), Nazi SS concentration camp commandant
 Robert L. Lippert (1909–1976), American film producer and theater chain owner
 Rudolf Lippert (1900–1945), German World War II army Generalmajor and Olympic equestrian
 Sofie Lippert (born 1995), Danish politician
 Wolfgang Lippert (actor), German entertainer and actor
 Wolfgang Lippert (pilot) (1914–1941), World War II Luftwaffe flying ace

See also
 Liebert (disambiguation)
Liepert
 Lipper

German-language surnames
Surnames from given names